The surname Whiting is of Saxon origin meaning 'the white or fair offspring'. The Saxon suffix "-ing" denotes 'son of' or 'offspring'. It is a patronymic name from the Old English pre-7th Century 'Hwita' meaning 'the white' or 'fair one'. The surname first appears in documentation from the late 11th Century and has a number of variant forms ranging from 'Whiteing', and 'Whitting' to 'Witting'. However, the name was first found in Devon where it was seated both before and after the Norman Conquest.

In Great Britain, there are an estimated 3,169 individuals  with the surname Whiting. According to the 1990 U.S. Census, Whiting is the 2,565th most popular surname in the United States, carried by 0.005% of the population.

People with the surname
A. Chapin Whiting (1825–1899), member of the Wisconsin State Assembly
Alan Whiting, British screenwriter
Albert N. Whiting (1917–2020), President and Chancellor of North Carolina College
Albert Whiting (1866–1946), Australian cricketer
Algernon Whiting (1861–1931), English first-class cricketer and tea planter
Allen S. Whiting (1926–2018), American political scientist specializing in China
Anderson Whiting, member of the Wisconsin State Assembly
Andrea Whiting, fictional character on the American soap opera Search for Tomorrow
Ant Whiting, writer/producer signed to Sony/ATV Music Publishing
Arthur Batelle Whiting (1861–1936), American teacher, pianist, composer, and writer on music
Arthur Whiting (1878–1938), British politician
Barbara Whiting (1931–2004), American actress
Beatrice Blyth Whiting (1914–2003), American anthropologist
Betty Whiting (1925–1967), American baseball player
Bob Whiting (1883–1917), aka Pom Pom Whiting, English professional footballer
Brandon Whiting (born 1976), former American football player
Brendan Whiting 1936–2009, Australian author and researcher
Calvin Whiting (born 1995), South African-born American rugby union player
Carl Whiting (born 1981), New Zealand sailor
Chancey Whiting (1819–1902), Latter Day Saint leader
Charles Whiting (1926–2007), British writer and military historian
Charles Whiting (cricketer) (1888–1959), English cricketer
Charles S. Whiting (1863–1922), Associate Justice of the South Dakota Supreme Court
Charlie Whiting (1952–2019), FIA Formula One race director
Chris Whiting (born 1966), Australian politician
Cliff Whiting (born 1936), New Zealand Maori artist
Danny Whiting, fictional character in BBC soap opera EastEnders
Ed Whiting (1860–?), American professional baseball player
Elizabeth Whiting (born 1952), stage costume designer from New Zealand
Erle Whiting (1876–1958), the fifth president of The Church of Jesus Christ (Cutlerite)
Fred Whiting (born 1938), American former politician
Frederic Allen Whiting (1873–1959), advocate for education, pioneer for public outreach, philanthropist
Frederic Whiting (1874–1962), English painter
Gains Whiting (1865–1946), New Zealand trade unionist and political activist
George Whiting (1840–1923), American composer of classical music
George A. Whiting (1884–1943), American vaudeville song and dance man
Gordon Whiting (1942–2018), judge of the Environment Court of New Zealand
Graham Whiting (born 1946), New Zealand former rugby footballer
Henry H. Whiting (1923–2012), member of the Supreme Court of Virginia in the 1980s and 1990s
Isaac Whiting (1842–1922), the third president of The Church of Jesus Christ (Cutlerite)
Jack Whiting (1894–1975), English cricketer
Jack Whiting (actor) (1901–1961), American actor, singer and dancer
James Whiting (born 1949), known professionally as Sugar Blue, American blues harmonica player
James R. Whiting (1803–1872), New York judge
Jeff Whiting (born 1972), American theater director, choreographer, performer and entrepreneur
Jennifer Whiting, American philosopher who teaches at the University of Pittsburgh
Jesse Whiting (1879–1937), pitcher in Major League Baseball
Jillian Whiting, Australian news presenter
Jim Whiting (born 1951), British artist and inventor
John Lanyon Whiting (1851–1922), lawyer and politician in Ontario, Canada
John Whiting (1917–1963), John Robert Whiting, English actor, dramatist and critic
John Whiting (anthropologist) (1908–1999), John Wesley Mayhew Whiting, American sociologist and anthropologist
John Whiting (MP) (died 1430), of Shaftesbury, Dorset, was an English Member of Parliament and lawyer
Julian Whiting (1912–2004), the seventh president of The Church of Jesus Christ (Cutlerite)
Justin Rice Whiting (1847–1903), Michigan politician
Ken Whiting (born 1974), Canadian kayaker
Kenneth Whiting (1881–1943), United States Navy officer and American pioneer of naval aviation
Leonard Whiting (born 1950), British actor
Lilian Whiting (1847–1942), American journalist and author
Lorenzo D. Whiting (1819–1889), American politician
Lynn S. Whiting (1939–2017), trainer of Thoroughbred racehorses
Margaret Whiting (1924–2011), American popular music and country music singer
Margaret Whiting (actress) (born 1933), British film and television actress
Marian Muriel Whiting (1881–1978), British horticulturalist and plant collector
Mark Whiting (born 1964), American writer, director, designer and actor
Mary Collins Whiting (1835–1912), lawyer, business woman, teacher
Michael F. Whiting, American director of the Brigham Young University DNA Sequencing Center
Michael Whiting (born 1960), former American football fullback in the United States Football League
Milton Whiting (1922–2010), Australian politician
Napoleon Whiting (1910–1984), African-American character actor
Nathan Whiting (1724–1771), soldier and merchant in colonial America
Nathaniel Whiting (mill owner) (1609-1682), a settler of Dedham, Massachusetts
Nathaniel N. Whiting (1792–1872), American Baptist preacher
Norman Whiting (1920–2014), English cricketer
Onslow Whiting (1872–1937), was an English sculptor and teacher
Pat Whiting (1940–2010), American activist and politician from Oregon
Paul Whiting, New Zealand yacht designer during the 1970s and early 1980s
Percy H. Whiting, American author, newspaper reporter and professional speaker
Peter Whiting (footballer), New Zealand football goalkeeper
Peter Whiting (rugby union) (born 1946), New Zealand rugby union player
Richard Whiting (abbot) (died 1539), last abbot of Glastonbury Abbey before Dissolution of the Monasteries
Richard Whiting (rugby league), English rugby league player
Richard A. Whiting (1891–1938), writer of popular songs, father of Margaret Whiting and Barbara Whiting Smith
Richard H. Whiting (1826–1888), U.S. Representative from Illinois
Robert Whiting (born 1942), American author and journalist
Roy Whiting (born 1959), English murderer of Sarah Payne
Rutherford Lester Whiting (born 1930), Canadian politician
Ryan Whiting (born 1986), American track and field athlete
Samuel Whiting, Jr. (1633–1733), First Minister of Billerica, Massachusetts
Sarah Frances Whiting (1847–1927), American physicist and astronomer
Sarah Whiting (born 1964), American architect, critic, Dean of the Rice University School of Architecture
Scott Whiting (born 1978), Australian former rugby league footballer
Stephen N. Whiting, Lieutenant General in the United States Space Force
Tossie Whiting (1879–1958), American educator and Dean of Women at Virginia State University
Tracy Denean Sharpley-Whiting, feminist scholar
Val Whiting (born 1972), former professional basketball player
W. H. Whiting Jr. (1862–1949), twice acting president of Hampden–Sydney College
Walter Whiting (1888–1952), English cricketer
Warren Whiting (1816–1897), member of the Wisconsin State Assembly
William Whiting (footballer), English footballer
William Whiting (poet) (1825–1878), English writer and hymnist, wrote the words to Eternal Father, Strong to Save (The Navy Hymn)
William Whiting (politician) (1813–1873), American congressman from Massachusetts
William Whiting II (politician) (1841–1911), U.S. Representative from Massachusetts
William Austin Whiting (1855–1908) was an American lawyer and politician of Hawaii
William Dean Whiting (1815–1891), American silversmith and jeweler
William F. Whiting (1864–1936), William Fairfield Whiting, Massachusetts politician, United States Secretary of Commerce 1928–1929
William H. C. Whiting (1824–1865), William Henry Chase Whiting, American Civil War army officer
Zach Whiting (born 1987), the Iowa State Senator from the 1st District

See also
Waiting (disambiguation)
Weeting
Weighting
Whitening (disambiguation)
Whitin (disambiguation)
Whitting

References

English-language surnames